Sofia Sakorafa (born 29 April 1957 in Trikala, Greece) is a Greek-Palestinian politician and former javelin thrower. She was a Member of the European Parliament for Greece as member of the political party MeRA25, having formerly sat for Syriza and before that served, from June 2012 to July 2014, as a Syriza Member of the Hellenic Parliament. She now serves as a deputy speaker in the Hellenic Parliament for the MeRA25 party.
She is the president of Association hellénique d'athlétisme amateur (SEGAS).

Education 

Sakorafa graduated in physical education from the Aristotle University of Thessaloniki.

Athletics 

She started competing in athletics at age fifteen as a member of Trikala Gymnastic Club. In total, Sakorafa – often pushed by her antagonism with Anna Verouli – broke the Greek record for the javelin seventeen times. She competed in the 1976 and 1980 Summer Olympics.

She won the bronze medal at the 1982 European Championships in Athens. A few days later, on 26 September 1982,   at the Greek national championships in Chania, Sakorafa broke the world record with a throw of 74.20 metres. That mark stood as a Greek record until the new javelin was introduced in 1999.

In 1983, after winning the Balkan Games, she had achieved the third performance of the year with a throw of 72.28 m, but eventually had to withdraw from the World Championships in Helsinki, due to injury.

Competition record

2004 Olympics 

Sakorafa stirred controversy in 2004 when she became a Palestinian citizen and applied a few months before the Olympic Games for a berth on the Palestinian Olympic team at the age of 47. She made her debut representing Palestine in Chania, Crete, on 28 June 2004 - her performance was 47.23 metres. Despite the fact that her gesture to participate as a Palestinian was symbolic, the IAAF ruled her ineligible for the 2004 Summer Olympics.

Professional career 

Sakorafa worked in as a secondary teacher of physical education before working as a freelance. From 1994 to 1996, she served as an adviser to the sports minister and as Chairman of the Commission for Sport and Woman.

Political career 

She has served on the City Councils of Athens, from 1994 to 1998, and Maroussi, from 1998 to 2006. She was elected as a member of the Hellenic Parliament under the banner of PASOK three times (in the elections of 2000, 2007 and 2009). She failed to win a seat in parliament following the 2004 elections.

On 6 May 2010 she refused to vote in favour of the austerity measures and the loan agreement between the Greek government and the IMF/EU. As a result, she was expelled from PASOK and served as an independent member of the parliament until 2012.

She participated in the 2012 legislative elections as a member of Syriza and was elected in Athens B. In the Shadow Cabinet of Alexis Tsipras, she had responsibility for the interior. She resigned from the Hellenic Parliament in May 2014 in order to contest the European Parliament election.

In the 2014 European Parliament elections, she was elected as a Member of European Parliament for Greece, representing Syriza. She is a member of the Committee on Foreign Affairs, the Committee on Petitions and is a substitute for the Committee on Industry, Research and Energy. Since 16 October 2014, she has been the chair of the Delegation for relations with the countries of Central America, having previously been a member. She is therefore also a member of the Conference of Delegation Chairs.

On 28 September 2015, Sakorafa left Syriza and currently sits as an Independent within the GUE/NGL grouping. She resigned from Syriza over disagreements with the leadership over the introduction of further austerity measures in Greece. She said: "It's clear that I cannot support any government nor any policies that involve measures that harm the people."

In December 2018 Sofia Sakorafa joined the Greek party MeRA25. On 26 May 2019, she narrowly lost reelection as a member of the European Parliament as member of MeRA25.

References

External links
 
http://goliath.ecnext.com/coms2/summary_0199-4190090_ITM

This article incorporates text from the article Sofia_Sakorafa on Phantis.com, which is licensed under the GFDL.

1957 births
Living people
Wikipedia articles licensed under the GNU Free Document License
Greek sportsperson-politicians
Greek female javelin throwers
Athletes (track and field) at the 1976 Summer Olympics
Athletes (track and field) at the 1980 Summer Olympics
Sportspeople from Trikala
Olympic athletes of Greece
People from Trikala
Greek MPs 2007–2009
Greek MPs 2009–2012
Greek MPs 2012 (May)
European Athletics Championships medalists
Syriza MEPs
MEPs for Greece 2014–2019
21st-century women MEPs for Greece
Mediterranean Games gold medalists for Greece
Mediterranean Games bronze medalists for Greece
Mediterranean Games medalists in athletics
Athletes (track and field) at the 1979 Mediterranean Games
Athletes (track and field) at the 1987 Mediterranean Games
Greek MPs 2019–2023
Naturalized citizens of the State of Palestine